Warragoon is a small community in the central part of the Riverina. It is situated by road, about 11 kilometres north west from Tuppal and 14 kilometres south west from Blighty.

Warragoon has a public school situated on the Riverina Highway.

Notes and references

Towns in the Riverina
Towns in New South Wales
Edward River Council